Marillier is a surname. Notable people with the surname include:

 Dougie Marillier (born 1978), Zimbabwean cricketer
 Garance Marillier (born 1998), French actress
 Juliet Marillier (born 1948), New Zealand-born writer of fantasy
 William Marillier (1832–1896), English cricketer

See also
 Marillier shot, a shot in cricket